Preston Michael O'Berry (born April 20, 1954) is an American former professional baseball player and minor league manager. He played as a catcher in Major League Baseball from 1979 to 1985.

Major league career 
O'Berry was drafted at the age of 21 by the Boston Red Sox in the twenty-second round of the 1975 amateur player draft. He made his major league debut with the Red Sox on April 18, 1979. At the end of the 1979 season, O'Berry was traded to the Chicago Cubs as the player to be named later in an earlier deal the Red Sox made for Ted Sizemore. O'Berry continued to move from team to team after one or two years, serving as a journeyman backup catcher for the Cubs, Cincinnati Reds, California Angels, New York Yankees, and Montreal Expos before retiring after the 1985 season at the age of 31.

Managerial career 
O'Berry managed minor league and independent teams from 1992 to 1998. In his first season, he managed the Bluefield Orioles to their first Appalachian League championship title. He stayed in the Baltimore Orioles organization until 1996, which was the first of his three seasons with the independent Tennessee Tomahawks. After his stint as a professional baseball manager, O'Berry decided to stay close to home and coach the Pelham High School Panthers. O'Berry coached the team from 2001 to 2006, leading the team to its first state title in 2004. Under his reign, the team gained national recognition and was a powerhouse in the 6A division.

References

External links
Mike O'Berry – Baseball-Reference.com

1954 births
Living people
American expatriate baseball players in Canada
Baseball players from Birmingham, Alabama
Boston Red Sox players
Bristol Red Sox players
California Angels players
Chicago Cubs players
Cincinnati Reds players
Columbus Clippers players
Edmonton Trappers players
High school baseball coaches in the United States
Indianapolis Indians players
Major League Baseball catchers
Midland Cubs players
Minor league baseball managers
Montreal Expos players
New York Yankees players
Pawtucket Red Sox players
South Alabama Jaguars baseball players
Tigres de Aragua players
American expatriate baseball players in Venezuela
Wichita Aeros players
Winston-Salem Red Sox players
Winter Haven Red Sox players